Tall, Dark and Handsome is a 1941 gangster comedy film directed by H. Bruce Humberstone and starring Caesar Romero, Virginia Gilmore, and Charlotte Greenwood. It was released by Twentieth Century Fox.

Plot 
In Chicago, a Robin Hood-like crook is an object of affection, nice to some and not so nice to others.

Chicago mobster boss Shep Morrison (Cesar Romero), who has a reputation as a brutal killer, falls for department store employee Judy Miller (Virginia Gilmore) on Christmas Eve. Learning that Miller's job is to babysit children for shoppers, the unmarried Morrison presents himself to her as a widowed father in the banking industry, and hires her to help with his children. Morrison quickly dispatches his henchman Frosty Welch (Milton Berle) to find children to pose as his. Welch returns with only one child, Detroit Harry, Jr. (Stanley Clements). As Miller helps Morrison decorate his Christmas tree, he mentions that his other child is with grandma for the holidays.

Thugs Puffy (Frank Jenks) and Louie (Marc Lawrence) interrupt the happy scene, upon orders from rival crime boss Pretty Willie (Sheldon Leonard) to kill Morrison.  Rather than kill them, Morrison and Welch lock them in the basement. Pretty Willie arrives the next day and is convinced Morrison has killed Puffy and Louie.  The two mob bosses reach a gangland cease fire agreement to conduct their criminal activities in different areas.

By now, Miller realizes who Morrison really is, but he smooths thing over by getting Miller a job as a vocalist in the nightclub, and by agreeing to watch over Harry, Jr. She realizes she has fallen in love with him in spite of his criminal activities, and accepts his marriage proposal. It is soon revealed that Morrison has never killed anyone, when the thugs escape from the basement. Morrison makes newspaper headlines when word leaks out that he's a mob boss who has never murdered his rivals.

Cast 
 Cesar Romero as J.J. 'Shep' Morrison
 Virginia Gilmore as Judy Miller
 Charlotte Greenwood as Winnie Sage
 Milton Berle as Frosty Welch
 Sheldon Leonard as 'Pretty' Willie Williams
 Stanley Clements as Detroit Harry Morrison Jr.
 Frank Jenks as Puffy
 Barnett Parker as Quentin, the Butler
 Marc Lawrence as Louie
 Paul Hurst as Biff Sage
 Frank Bruno as Chick - Driver / Gunman
 Anthony Caruso as Gunman
 Marion Martin as Dawn
 Leon Belasco as Alfredo Herrera
 Charles D. Brown as District Attorney

Awards 
The film was nominated for the Best Original Screenplay at the 14th Academy Awards.

See also
 Tall, dark and handsome

References

External links 
 
 
 
 

1941 films
20th Century Fox films
American gangster films
1941 comedy films
American comedy films
Films directed by H. Bruce Humberstone
1940s English-language films
1940s American films